Sweden did not compete in the Eurovision Song Contest 1970, as a protest against that four countries shared the victory the preceding year. They were, however, back for the 1971 contest. Five semi-finals, with the same three competitors in all of them, were held in the popular TV show Hylands hörna. The group Family Four won all of the semi-finals, and therefore sung all the songs in the final. The song "Vita vidder", written and composed by Håkan Elmquist, won and represented Sweden at ESC, held in Dublin.

Before Eurovision

Melodifestivalen 1971 
Melodifestivalen 1971 was the selection for the 12th song to represent Sweden at the Eurovision Song Contest. It was the 11th time that this system of picking a song had been used. 1164 songs were submitted to SVT for the competition. There were five semi-finals during the Hylands hörna programme, hosted by Lennart Hyland. Family Four, Tommy Körberg and Sylvia Vrethammar performed one song in each semi-final. Family Four won all five semi-finals, so all five finalists were performed by them. The final was held in the SVT Studios in Stockholm on 27 February 1971 and was broadcast on TV1 but was not broadcast on radio.

Final

At Eurovision 
Family Four finished 6th out of 18, scoring high points from Switzerland and the Netherlands.

Voting

References

External links
ESCSweden.com (in Swedish)
Information site about Melodifestivalen
Eurovision Song Contest National Finals

1971
Countries in the Eurovision Song Contest 1971
1971
Eurovision
Eurovision